Harry Gwala is one of the 11 districts of KwaZulu-Natal province of South Africa. The seat of Harry Gwala is Ixopo. The majority of its 298 392 people speak IsiZulu (2011 Census). The district code is DC43. In November 2015, Sisonke District's name was changed to Harry Gwala District, in honor of African National Congress leader Harry Gwala.

Geography

Neighbours 
Harry Gwala is surrounded by:
 Umgungundlovu to the north-east (DC22)
 Ugu to the south-east (DC21)
 OR Tambo to the south (DC15)
 Alfred Nzo to the south-west (DC44)
 The kingdom of Lesotho to the north-west
 Uthukela to the North (DC23)

Local municipalities 
The district contains the following local municipalities:

Demographics
The following statistics are from the 2001 census.

Gender

Ethnic group

Age

Politics

Election results 
Election results for Harry Gwala in the South African general election, 2004. 
 Population 18 and over: 157 807 [52.89% of total population] 
 Total votes: 83 403 [27.95% of total population] 
 Voting % estimate: 52.85% votes as a % of population 18 and over

References

External links
 Official Website

District Municipalities of KwaZulu-Natal
Harry Gwala District Municipality